Millind Gaba (born 7 December  1990) is an Indian singer, songwriter, music producer and actor associated with Punjabi and Bollywood music. He is known for his songs "Nazar Lag Jayegi", "She Don't Know" and "Yaar Mod Do".

Career

As a singer 
His popular singles are "Nazar Lag Jayegi", "She Don't Know", "Main Teri Ho Gayi", "Zindagi Di Paudi", "Peele Peele", "Beautiful", "Nachunga Aise", "Kya Karu" and "Dilli Shehar". He has worked with Punjabi language singer Guru Randhawa in the song "Yaar Mod Do".

The music video for his song "She Don't Know" was released on 8 January 2019 by T-Series on YouTube. The video had amassed over 500 million views as of January 2021.

As an actor 
He made his debut as an actor in the Punjabi film Stupid 7.

Personal life
Gaba married fashion blogger Pria Beniwal on 16 April 2022.

Discography

Film Songs

Singles

Television

References

External links

Millind Gaba at Instagram

Living people
Indian male singers
Indian male composers
Male actors in Hindi cinema
1990 births
Bigg Boss (Hindi TV series) contestants